Zeita Jamma'in is a Palestinian village in the Nablus Governorate in northern West Bank, located 16 kilometers southwest of Nablus. The village is located just north of Jamma'in, from which the village receives its name. According to the Palestinian Central Bureau of Statistics (PCBS), Zeita Jamma'in had a population of 1,962 inhabitants in mid-year 2006.

Location
Zeita Jamma’in is a located 11.6 km southwest of Nablus. It is bordered by Jamma’in and ‘Asira al Qibliya to the east, Tell to the north, Deir Istiya to the west, Kifl Haris, Qira and Jamma’in to the south.

History
Potsherds, possibly from the Middle Bronze Age era was found, together with sherds from Iron Age I, and IA II, Persian, Hellenistic, Roman, Byzantine, Umayyad, Abbasid, Crusader/Ayyubid and Mamluk eras were found here.

Ottoman era
In 1517,  the village was included in the Ottoman empire with the rest of Palestine,  and it appeared in the 1596 tax-records as Zayta Bani 'Amir,   located in the Nahiya of Jabal Qubal of the Liwa of Nablus.  The population was 26 households, all Muslim. They paid a fixed tax rate of 33,3% on agricultural products, such as wheat, barley, summer crops, olive trees, goats and beehives and a press for olive oil or grape syrup, in addition to occasional revenues and a fixed tax for people of Nablus area; a total of 10,114 akçe. Sherds from the early Ottoman era have been found here.

In 1838, Edward Robinson noted it as a village, Zeita,  in the Jurat Merda district, south of Nablus.

In 1870 Victor Guérin noted it, situated on a hill lower than that of Jamma'in. It was also surrounded by plantations of olive and fig trees, and contained eight hundred inhabitants.

In 1882, the PEF's Survey of Western Palestine (SWP) described Zeita as:  "a small stone village, on high ground, with a well to the west, and olive groves."

British Mandate era
In the 1922 census of Palestine conducted by the British Mandate authorities, Zeita had a population of 283 Muslims, increasing in the 1931 census to 404 Muslims and 1 Christian,  in 113 houses.

In the 1945 statistics the population was 510 Muslims,  while the total land area was 12,887 dunams, according to an official land and population survey. 
Of this, 2,429 dunams were for plantations and irrigable land, 4,277 for cereals, while 43 dunams were classified as built-up areas.

Jordanian era
In the wake of the 1948 Arab–Israeli War, and after the 1949 Armistice Agreements, Zeita Jamma'in came  under Jordanian rule.

The Jordanian census of 1961 found 708 inhabitants.

Post 1967
Since the Six-Day War in 1967, Zeita Jamma'in has been under  Israeli occupation.

After the 1995 accords 99.7 % of village land is declared to be Area B land, while 0.3 % is Area C.

References

Bibliography

External links
Welcome To Zayta
Survey of Western Palestine, Map 14: IAA, Wikimedia commons
Zeita Jamma’in Village Profile, Applied Research Institute–Jerusalem (ARIJ)
Zeita Jamma'in, aerial photo, ARIJ

Nablus Governorate
Villages in the West Bank
Municipalities of the State of Palestine